This article is a catalog of actresses and models who have appeared on the cover of Harper's Bazaar Serbia, the Serbian edition of Harper's Bazaar magazine, starting with the magazine's first issue in October 2014.

2014

2015

2016

2017

2018

2019

External links
 Harper's Bazaar Serbia
 Harper's Bazaar Serbia on Models.com

Serbia